Abu ‘Umayr ‘Abd al-Hasib al-Logari was an Afghan Islamic militant who led the Islamic State of Iraq and the Levant – Khorasan Province from July 2016 until his death on 27 April 2017.

History
He was born in Kurram District, Kohat Division, Khyber Pakhtunkhwa in Pakistan (formerly Kurram Agency of the Federally Administered Tribal Areas) and was believed to be in his mid-thirties at the time of his death in 2017.

Islamic education

He studied in seminaries in Peshawar, Pakistan controlled by Jamaat al Dawa al Quran. He studied for eight years at the Jamia Imam Bukhari in Sargodha which was run by Haji Inyat ur Rehman, a son of Jamil al-Rahman. Later he studied for four years at Ganj madrassa, in Peshawar, headed by Abu Mohammad Aminullah Peshawari. He was fluent in Arabic, Persian and English in addition to his native Pashto and Urdu.

After his studies, he left Pakistan for Afghanistan and spent two years as a member of the Afghan Taliban teaching Islamic law, before joining the Khorasan Province of the Islamic State. He was a deputy to the wali Hafiz Saeed Khan before being appointed as the second wali of Khorasan province in July 2016.

Death

On 26 April 2017, 50 American special forces from the 3rd Battalion, 75th Ranger Regiment (United States) and 40 Afghan commandos launched a raid in Mohmand valley, Achin District, Nangarhar Province in an attempt to capture Haseeb at his compound in the area. The firefight lasted three hours, during which two US Rangers were killed, Sgt. Joshua Rodgers, 22, of Bloomington, Illinois, and Sgt. Cameron Thomas, 23 of Kettering, Ohio. A third Ranger was lightly injured.

The US claimed 35 IS fighters were killed along with several high-level leaders, suspected to include Haseeb, but did not confirm that Haseeb had in fact been killed. IS claimed that 100 civilians were killed and injured due to US airstrikes during and after the raid.

On 8 May 2017, the US affirmed he had been killed in the raid.

References

Islamic State of Iraq and the Levant in Afghanistan
Islamic State of Iraq and the Levant members
Leaders of Islamic terror groups
Taliban leaders
2017 deaths
People from Kurram District
People from Logar Province
Afghan Islamists